Martin Müller (born 28 January 1957) is a retired Swiss football striker.

References

1957 births
Living people
Swiss men's footballers
SC Young Fellows Juventus players
Neuchâtel Xamax FCS players
FC Aarau players
Grasshopper Club Zürich players
FC Luzern players
Association football forwards
Swiss Super League players
FC Luzern managers
Swiss football managers